City of Lusaka F.C. is football (soccer) Zambian club based in Lusaka founded in 1937. They are a member of the Football Association Zambia. They play their home games at Woodlands Stadium.

The club plays in black and white colours.

History
City of Lusaka played in the Zambian Premier League in 2002–03/ 2007-10/ 2017. The team is currently playing in the second tier of Zambian league (FAZ/ Eden University division one national league).

Honours
Old First Division champions (1964,1970)
First division champions (2016)
FAZ Provincial Cup champions (2020)

Notable former coaches

 Chris Tembo (2015)
 Davy Musole (2015)
 Elijah Chikwanda (2017)
 Hector Chilombo (2017)
 Roberto Randi (2017)
 George Kapembwa (2018)
 Vaselin Velusic (2020)
 Jordi Rovira (2021)
 Isaac Chansa (2021)
 Albert Mphande (2022)
 Slawomir Cisakowski (2022-current)

Club officials/Technical team

Chairman:  Chomba Mumba
Vice Chairman:  Justin Zulu
Technical director/Head coach :  Sławomir Cisakowski 
Goalkeeping coach:  Donald Phiri
Youth Head coach:  Bruce Lumino
Physiotherapist:  Matthews Kabundi
Team manager:  Hassan Adams
Media Manager:  Innocent Mwansa
Kit manager:  Oswald Sichinga
Match Organizer:  George B Njovu

References

Football clubs in Zambia
Sport in Lusaka
Association football clubs established in 1937
1937 establishments in Northern Rhodesia

External links

Official website